Hawkey is a surname. Notable people with the surname include:

Raymond Hawkey
Renn Hawkey
Christian Hawkey
Eric Hawkey

See also
hawkey, a high-level API for the libsolv library